William A. Thomas Jr. (born June 1, 1947) is a businessman, commercial fisherman, and politician from the U.S. state of Alaska.  Thomas served as a Republican member of the Alaska House of Representatives from the 5th District, comprising scattered rural and semi-rural communities throughout Southeast Alaska and stretching westward to Prince William Sound, from 2005 to 2013. Thomas served in the majority his entire tenure in the House and held multiple chairmanships.  Thomas gained a seat on the powerful House Finance Committee during his second term and would eventually co-chair the committee. Following redistricting, Thomas lost reelection in 2012 by 32 votes to 23-year-old Jonathan Kreiss-Tomkins, a political newcomer who left Yale University to run.

Early life
William A. Thomas Jr. was born in Haines, Territory of Alaska on June 1, 1947, and is a lifelong resident of Haines and the surrounding Chilkat Valley. He is descended from the Tlingit Natives of nearby Klukwan village.  Speaking before a Native organization in Juneau about his origins, Thomas once explained "And the Thomas?  That came from California".

Bill Thomas graduated from Haines High School in 1965. Shortly thereafter, he briefly attended the University of Alaska before joining the U.S. Army, where he served for two years. While in the Army, he served 6 months in Vietnam in 1968 during the Vietnam War.

Business career
Bill Thomas began commercial fishing for a living ca. 1970, and has continued in this line of work ever since.  He has mostly run gillnets and longlines.

Thomas has also served as chairman and CEO of his village's Native corporate, Klukwan, Inc.  This position has led to Thomas serving on the board of directors of a number of the corporation's subsidiaries.

Political career

Early political career
Bill Thomas began working as a lobbyist in Juneau ca. 1991, mostly representing small community concerns throughout Southeast Alaska. He also spent four years apiece on the Haines Borough assembly (legislative body) and school board.

In 2004, Democrat Georgianna Lincoln, who represented the sprawling, rural District C in the Alaska Senate (Lincoln hailed from the Yukon River village of Rampart), did not seek reelection.  5th District member of the Alaska House of Representatives, Albert Kookesh, filed to run for the Senate, eventually winning. Thomas ran for the 5th District House seat, citing his experience as a lobbyist as being beneficial to the position. Thomas won election in 2004 by 59 votes over Tim June, a fellow commercial fisherman from Haines, who was active in environmental and watershed issues for many years. Thomas would be reelected mostly easily thereafter, including defeating June by an approximately 61 to 38 percent margin in 2008.

Alaska House of Representatives

24th Alaska State Legislature
In the 24th Alaska State Legislature, Thomas served as co-chair of the House Community and Regional Affairs Committee, as well as co-chair of the Fisheries Committee.  He also served on the Education, Military and Veterans' Affairs and the Transportation Committees in the House.
2007-2008
Member, Finance Committee
2005-2006
Commerce, Community & Economic Development
Fish & Game
Transportation
2007-2008
Chair, Administration
Chair, Fish & Game
since 2004. He served as co-chair of the Finance Committee and was a member of the Legislative Budget & Audit Committee. He also chaired the Governor and the Legislature Finance Subcommittees for the 27th Legislature.

2012 election loss
Due to an Alaskan Supreme Court order, the redistricting board has redrawn the district lines for the 2012 election based on state constitutional requirements. Major changes have been proposed to the Southeast region, including Thomas's district. The proposed plan combines the 5th District with Juneau, the state capital directly to the south. Constituents from Haines Borough have objected to the new map, town mayor Stephanie Scott stated "we do not believe that we are socio-economically integrated with the Mendenhall Valley, we don't have the same concerns, the same needs." Jonathan Kreiss-Tomkins of Sitka was the Democratic challenger to Thomas.

Kreiss-Tomkins subsequently defeated Thomas by 32 votes, following a recount.  As ballot-counting continued beyond election day, the lead went back and forth, even tying at one point.

References

External links
 Alaska State House Majority Site for Rep. Bill Thomas
 House Majority Site RSS Feed for Rep. Bill Thomas
 Legislative Facebook Page for Rep. Bill Thomas
 Alaska State Legislature Biography for Rep. Bill Thomas
 Project Vote Smart profile
 Bill Thomas 2012 Campaign Website
 Bill Thomas 2012 Campaign RSS Feed
 Bill Thomas 2012 Campaign Facebook Page
 Bill Thomas at 100 Years of Alaska's Legislature

1947 births
Living people
21st-century American politicians
21st-century Native Americans
Alaska Native people
American fishers
United States Army personnel of the Vietnam War
Borough assembly members in Alaska
Republican Party members of the Alaska House of Representatives
Native American state legislators in Alaska
People from Haines Borough, Alaska
School board members in Alaska
Tlingit people
University of Alaska Fairbanks alumni
United States Army soldiers